iobi, (pronounced eye-OH-bee), is a way of providing and managing telephone services over the Internet or PSTN-based telephone.  Among capabilities, a registered customer could use a connected personal computer to dial a phone number and then speak to the person, they can check their voicemail messages over computer, or additionally customers could select to have specific callers permanently blocked from dialing the subscriber's telephone number, such as from telemarketers.

Like VOIP (voice over IP) or Internet phone, iobi is a "network-based convergent solution that integrates communication services from landline and mobile phones to PCs, laptops and PDAs." Verizon was one of the ISPs to offer the integrated services under the iobi name.  The service has become grandfathered and has been replaced by a service named Call Assistant, which provides much of the same services as above, except customers are no longer able to block or ban certain telephone numbers from dialing the subscriber.

NOTE: This service has been discontinued by Verizon.

References
Verizon sets up Iobi Home By Ben Charny, (September 21, 2004 12:32 PM PDT), CNET News
Verizon launches Iobi phone manager service, (Posted 9/21/2004 4:44 PM), Reuters

External links
Official website
Verizon Call Assistant

Voice over IP
Verizon Communications